Ginoria is a genus of plants in the family Lythraceae.

Species
It contains the following species (the following list may be incomplete):
Ginoria nudiflora (Hemsley) Koehne

References

 
Lythraceae genera
Taxonomy articles created by Polbot